Nick Stuifbergen (born 6 September 1980, Breda) is a Dutch professional baseball pitcher. He played with the Netherlands national baseball team in the 2006 World Baseball Classic.

He also works as a Biology teacher at the Daaf Geluk school in Haarlem, Netherlands. He still plays baseball on the side.

References

1980 births
Living people
Dutch baseball players
Baseball pitchers
2006 World Baseball Classic players
Sportspeople from Breda